Estadio Agustín Tovar, also known as Estadio La Carolina, is a multi-purpose stadium in Barinas, Venezuela.  It is currently used mostly for football matches and it is the home stadium of Zamora FC. The stadium holds 30,000 people and was completed in 2007.

This stadium was re-built to increase its capacity from 12,000 people up to 30,000.

Copa América 2007
The stadium was one of the venues of the Copa América 2007, and held the following matches:

External links

 StadiumDB images

References

Agustin Tovar
Agustin Tova
Multi-purpose stadiums in Venezuela
Buildings and structures in Barinas (state)
2007 establishments in Venezuela